8 x 12"  is a studio album by the punk rock band The Stitches. It was released in 1995 on Vinyl Dog.

Track listing
All Songs Written by The Stitches, except where noted.
"Nowhere" 2:33
"I Can't Do Anything" 2:01
"Throw It Away" 1:36
"Better off Dead" 2:19
"My Baby Hates Me" 2:09
"True Stories" 2:24
"Amphetamine Girl" 2:09
"That Woman's Got Me Drinking" 2:49 (Shane MacGowan from The Pogues)

Personnel
Michael Lohrman: Vocals
Johnny Witner: Guitars
Pete Archer: Bass
Johnny Sleeper: Drums

References

The Stitches albums
1995 albums